Gabriel Irwin (born 1 July 1965) is an Irish former sportsperson. He played Gaelic football with his local club Glenamoy and was a member of the senior Mayo county team from 1983 until 1990.

Career

A shortage of underage activity in Glenamoy resulted in Irwin first playing competitive Gaelic football as a schoolboy with Lacken Cross Vocational School. Here he won consecutive Mayo VSSFC titles as well as a Connacht VSSFC title. Irwin also earned inclusion on the Mayo vocational schools' team and won an All-Ireland VSSFC title in 1982. He later won a Freshers' Cup title with Sligo Regional Technical College.

Irwin first appeared for Mayo as a member of the minor team in 1983, after being overlooked the year before. He was also drafted onto the under-21 team that year and won an All-Ireland U21FC medal. Irwin's four-year tenure with the under-21 also resulted in four successive Connacht U21FC medals. He joined the senior team as reserve goalkeeper in 1985. Irwin later made the starting fifteen and was in goal when Mayo suffered a defeat by Cork in the 1989 All-Ireland final. His performances throughout the season earned him an All-Star. Irwin left the inter-county scene in 1993, by which time he had also claimed five Connacht SFC medals.

Honours

Lacken Cross Vocational School
Connacht Vocational Schools Senior Football Championship: 1982
Mayo Vocational Schools Senior Football Championship: 1982, 1983
Connacht Vocational Schools Junior Football Championship: 1980

Sligo Regional Technical College
Higher Education Special Freshers Championship: 1984

Mayo
Connacht Senior Football Championship: 1985, 1988, 1989, 1992, 1993
All-Ireland Under-21 Football Championship: 1983
Connacht Under-21 Football Championship: 1983, 1984, 1985, 1986
All-Ireland Vocational Schools Championship: 1982

References

1965 births
Living people
Gaelic football goalkeepers
Glenamoy Gaelic footballers
Mayo inter-county Gaelic footballers